Elections to the Rajasthan Legislative Assembly were held in February 1962, to elect members of the 176 constituencies in Rajasthan, India. The Indian National Congress won the most seats as well as the popular vote, and its leader, Mohan Lal Sukhadia was reappointed as the Chief Minister of Rajasthan for his third term.

After the passing of The Delimitation of Parliamentary and Assembly Constituencies Order, 1961, double member constituencies were eliminated and Rajasthan's Legslative Assembly was assigned 176 single-member constituencies.

Result

Elected Members

Bypolls

See also 
 List of constituencies of the Rajasthan Legislative Assembly
 1962 elections in India

References

Rajasthan
1962
1962